Tomáš Špila (born 16 April 1984) is a Slovak former professional ice hockey player.

He played with HC Slovan Bratislava in the Slovak Extraliga.

References

1984 births
Living people
HC Slovan Bratislava players
Slovak ice hockey defencemen
Ice hockey people from Bratislava
Drummondville Voltigeurs players
HK Nitra players
Frederikshavn White Hawks players
Stjernen Hockey players
HC Slavia Praha players
HC Benátky nad Jizerou players
HC Prešov players
MsHK Žilina players
Slovak expatriate ice hockey players in the Czech Republic
Slovak expatriate ice hockey players in Canada
Slovak expatriate sportspeople in Norway
Slovak expatriate sportspeople in Denmark
Expatriate ice hockey players in Denmark
Expatriate ice hockey players in Norway